Peter K. Kilpatrick (born April 30, 1956) is the 16th and current president of The Catholic University of America.

Personal life 
Kilpatrick was born at Maxwell Air Force Base Montgomery, Alabama. His father was a founding member of the US Air Force and so his family moved often including to Guam and Turkey. He was not raised Catholic but, at the age of 10, experienced a personal Great Awakening and asked his parents to purchase him a 10 volume set of books knows as the Bible Series. A childhood friend was the son of a Methodist minister, and the minister baptized Kilpatrick that year. He later fell away from the faith.

Kilpatrick attended Occidental College and it was there, during their freshman year, that he met his wife, Nancy. They we’re assigned to the same chemistry research project during the summer after their junior year. They had their first date on July 8, 1977 and were engaged the following month. Nancy was Catholic and, while preparing to marry, the couple met with a priest. After Kilpatrick originally demurred, saying he wanted his children to make up their own minds, the priest persuaded him to agree to raise any future children in the Catholic faith "under a little duress."

The Kilpatricks have four children, Elisabeth, Zachary, Charlie, and Alexandra, and three grandchildren. Their third child was named after a priest, Father Charlie Mulholland.

When their first child, Elisabeth, was born, they visited their local parish in Minneapolis to have her baptized but, because they were not practicing Catholics, the priest refused. The couple then began attending Mass and Kilpatrick was so moved by the priest's pro-life homily that he "almost immediately converted." He went through the Rite of Christian Initiation for Adults (RCIA) and has been a practicing Catholic ever since. He later taught RCIA and Family Intergenerational Religious Education (FIRE) classes at St. Michael the Archangel Parish in Cary, North Carolina, his home parish. The Kilpatricks are still parishioners there, even though they no longer live in Cary.

Career
Kilpatrick earned his PhD in chemical engineering at the University of Minnesota. He began his teaching career at North Carolina State University in 1983. He rose from an assistant to associate and then full professor of chemical engineering. He served as the associate head of the department from 1996 to 1999 and then head of the chemistry and biomolecular engineering department from 1999 to 2007. During the years of 2004 to 2007, Kilpatrick was the founding director of the Biomanufacturing Training and Education Center.

In 2008, Kilpatrick became the dean of the College of Engineering at the University of Notre Dame and served in this position until 2018. While there, he launched a joint Ph.D. program with the Pontifical Catholic University of Chile. He also built a chapel in the engineering building where masses were said, in part to build a community of believers in the engineering program. During this time Kilpatrick also started a lecture series on the intersection of faith and science and helped sponsor many trips of 1,000 people to the March for Life in Washington, D.C. During this time, enrollment in the engineering school grew by 60%.

Kilpatrick then moved to the Illinois Institute of Technology where he was the provost and vice president for academic affairs from 2018 to 2022. During this time, he developed an online master's program geared towards students in China. The program is expected to bring in $10 million in net tutition revenue by 2025. He also hired four new deans and seven department chairs. He was planning to retire and return to North Carolina, but received a phone call from a friend asking him to consider applying for the president's position at The Catholic University of America. He originally said no, citing his plans to retire to the home in Cary, North Carolina he built in 2018 and to earn a Ph.D. in theology.

As a chemical engineer, Kilpatrick owns or co-owns 12 patents. He has published more than 100 journal articles.

Political views
Kilpatrick describes himself as "apolitical." He is pro-immigration and describes climate change as a "very, very serious." He is also strongly pro-life.

Awards
Kilpatrick won the American Society for Engineering Education Regional Teaching Award and a pro-life award from Notre Dame, among others. He holds an honorary doctorate from the Pazmany Peter Catholic University of Budapest, Hungary.

References

Living people
American Roman Catholics
North Carolina State University faculty
Occidental College alumni
University of Notre Dame people
Presidents of the Catholic University of America
People from Cary, North Carolina
Illinois Institute of Technology people
1956 births